Lani Maestro (born 1957) is a Filipino-Canadian artist who divides her time between France and Canada. She works in installation, sound, video, bookworks and writing. From 1990-94 Maestro was co-founder/co-publisher and designer of HARBOUR Magazine of Art and Everyday Life, a journal of artworks and writings by artists, writers and theorists based in Montreal.

Early life and education 
Maestro was born in Manila and studied at the University of the Philippines where she received a BFA. She pursued an MFA at NSCAD University in Halifax. She taught studio arts at the Nova Scotia College Of Art and Design (now known as NSCAD University). University of Lethbridge. For ten years, she taught in the MFA program at Concordia University.

Exhibition History
In 1994, the artist showed at the Chambre Blanche Gallery in Quebec City in an exhibition titled "Lani Maestro: A Wound in the Lung". Maestro showed an installation entitled "Paramita" in the Ohrenlust exhibition at the Centre d'Art Contemporain de Basse-Normandie in 1997. In 2006, the artist was featured in a solo exhibition at Dalhousie Art Gallery, curated by Susan Gibson Garvey.

Selected Participation in International Biennale 

 Singapore Biennale (2019)
 Maestro represented the Philippines at the Venice Biennale with artist Manuel Ocampo (2017) 
 Busan Biennale, Busan, Korea (2004)
 Shanghai Biennial, Shanghai, China (2001) 
 The Third Asia-Pacific Triennial of Contemporary Art, Brisbane, Australia (1999)
 The 11th Biennale of Sydney (1998)
 The Fifth Istanbul Biennial (1997)
 The Segunda and the Quinta Bienal dela Habana (Havana Biennial) (1986,1994)
 The Canadian Biennial of Contemporary Art (1989)

Selected Solo & Duo Exhibitions 
1994 - La Chambre Blanche, Quebec City, QC., a wound in the lung

1993 - OO Gallery, Halifax, N.S., Holding to Earth (collaborative exhibition)

1993 - Art Gallery of Ontario, Toronto, ON., Perspectives (two-person exhibition)

1991 - Art Speak Gallery, Vancouver, BC.

1990 - Galerie Articule, Montreal, QC., Monsoon

1990 - The Mount Saint Vincent Gallery, Halifax, N.S., Refuse

1989 - Gallery Connexion, Fredericton, N.B., incision to heal

1989 - Embassy Cultural House, London, ON, Water of Lethe

1989 - Eye Level Gallery, Halifax, N.S., Monsoon

1988 - Anna Leonowens Gallery, Halifax, N.S., The Heart is Stronger Than the Hand

1988 - dl gallery, Calgary, AB., The Heart is Stronger Than the Hand

1987 - Cultural Center for the Philippines, Manila, Suspended Voices

1985 - Latitude 53, Edmonton, AB., Unang Alay (First Offering)

1983 - Center for Art Tapes. Red Herring Cooperative,  Halifax, N.S., Correspondences

1983 - Amnesty International Conference, St. Mary's University, Halifax, N.S., Manila Envelopes

1981 - Cultural Center for the Philippines, Manila, New Works on Paper

Awards
Among her many awards is the Seugunda Bienal de la Habana in Cuba in 1985,  the Hnatyshyn Award for outstanding achievement by a Canadian artist in the visual arts in 2012. In 2018, she received an Honorary Doctorate Honoris Causa from NSCAD University in Canada

Publication 

Cradle: Lani Maestro by Carolyn Forchê (1996) 

Lani Maestro: Chambres de quiétude/ Quiet Rooms (2001) Gallerie De L'UQAM 

Paramita (2001) Centre d'Art Contemporain de Basse-Normandie (Hérouville St-Clair, France) 

je suis toi (2006) Wharf, Centre d'art contemporain de Basse-Normandie 

Lani Maestro: Sing Mother (twilight eats you) (2007) Dalhousie Art Gallery 

Lani Maestro "her rain (2011) Centre A - Vancouver International Centre for Contemporary Asian Art/ Plug In Institute of Contemporary Art (Winnipeg).

References 

1957 births
Living people
Canadian people of Filipino descent
21st-century Canadian artists
Filipino women artists
21st-century Canadian women artists